Class 387 may refer to:

British Rail Class 387
ČSD Class 387.0